Verkhny Yonkhor (Deede Yonkhor) is a rural locality (a selo) in Dzhidinsky District, Republic of Buryatia, Russia. The population was 86 as of 2010.

Geography 
Verkhny Yonkhor is located 54 km southeast of Petropavlovka (the district's administrative centre) by road. Botsy is the nearest rural locality.

References 

Rural localities in Dzhidinsky District